Lindsay Cann Gardner (December 27, 1875 – August 23, 1938) was a druggist and political figure in Nova Scotia, Canada. He represented Yarmouth County in the Nova Scotia House of Assembly from 1928 to 1938 as a Liberal member.

He was born in Yarmouth, Nova Scotia, the son of George Hunter Gardner and Henrietta Frances Smith. He was educated at the Brooklyn College of Pharmacy in New York state. In 1901, he married Dora A. Munro. Gardner was vice-president and then director for Minard's Liniment Company. Gardner was speaker for the provincial assembly from 1934 to 1938. He died in office at Yarmouth at the age of 62.

References 
 A Directory of the Members of the Legislative Assembly of Nova Scotia, 1758-1958, Public Archives of Nova Scotia (1958)

1875 births
1938 deaths
Nova Scotia Liberal Party MLAs
People from Yarmouth, Nova Scotia
Speakers of the Nova Scotia House of Assembly